Higher Medical School of Białystok (until 2012 known as Białystok Institute of Cosmetology and Healthcare is a private trade school in Białystok, Poland.  It offers a three-year course of study in the following specialities: cosmetology, nursing, public health (health and beauty promotion; paramedic studies) and physical therapy.  Its graduates receive a bachelor certificate (Polish: licencjat).  Its faculty includes members of the faculty of Białystok University, Białystok Technical University, and the Medical University of Białystok.

History
Białystok Institute of Cosmetology was opened on April 16, 2003. After its curriculum was widened to include nursing and public health, its name was expanded to Białystok Institute of Cosmetology and Healthcare.

School Authorities
Rector: prof. dr hab. R. Czerpak
Pro-Rector: dr inż. W. Puczyński

Cosmetology curriculum
Basic human anatomy
Histology
General chemistry
Biophysics with physiotherapy
Dietetics
Sanitation and sterilization
Types of cosmetics
Hairstyling and cosmetic products
Aesthetics
Hairstyling and cosmetic techniques
The outline of the history of cosmetology
Professional cosmetology
Basic psychology
Foreign language (English or German)
Basic human physiology
General biochemistry
General microbiology
Medicine with elements of pathophysiology
Dermatology
Allergology with immunology
Basic knowledge of medicines
Cosmetic chemistry
Chemistry of natural cosmetic ingredients
Basic pedagogy
Basic sociology
Evaluation of cosmetics
Aromatic substances
Toxicology
Electricity and machines
Basic economy and finances
Basic marketing and management
Laws and regulations at work
Basic commercial law
Diploma seminar
Diploma thesis
IT
Physical education
Practical training

External links

https://wsmed.edu.pl Official webpage

Education in Białystok
Universities and colleges in Poland
Nursing schools in Poland
Educational institutions established in 2003
2003 establishments in Poland

be:Вышэйшая медыцынская школа ў Беластоку
pl:Wyższa Szkoła Medyczna w Białymstoku